Ducarius was a Gallic nobleman from the Insubres who fought for Hannibal at the Battle of Lake Trasimene on 21 June 217 BC, during the Second Punic War, and, according to Livy, slew the Roman commander Gaius Flaminius. As described by Livy:

Little else is known of his life, and whether he survived the battle.

External links
Livy's History of Rome 

Celtic warriors
Gaulish people
People of the Second Punic War
3rd-century BC people